Newark Americans were a team in the first American Soccer League.  They were founded in 1930, but folded following the spring 1932 season.

Year-by-year

Defunct soccer clubs in New Jersey
American Soccer League (1921–1933) teams
1930 establishments in New Jersey
1932 disestablishments in New Jersey
Sports in Newark, New Jersey
Association football clubs established in 1930
Association football clubs disestablished in 1932